Kochiomyces is a genus of fungi belonging to the family Spizellomycetaceae.

The species of this genus are found in Denmark.

Species:
 Kochiomyces dichotomus (Umphlett) D.J.S.Barr

References

Chytridiomycota
Chytridiomycota genera